Hydrogen-bonded organic frameworks (HOFs) are a class of two- or three-dimensional materials formed by hydrogen bonds among molecular monomer units to afford porosity and structural flexibility (Fig. 1). There are diverse hydrogen bonding pair choices that could be used in HOFs construction, including identical or nonidentical hydrogen bonding donors and acceptors. For organic groups acting as hydrogen bonding units, species like carboxylic acid, amide, 2,4-diaminotriazine, and imidazole, etc., are commonly used for the formation of hydrogen bonding interaction. Compared with other organic frameworks, like COF and MOF, the binding force of HOFs is relatively weaker and the activation of HOFs is more difficult than other frameworks, while the reversibility of hydrogen bonds guarantees a high crystallinity of the materials. Though the stability and pore size expansion of HOFs has potential problems, HOFs still show strong potential for applications in different areas.

Important consequence of the natural porous architecture of hydrogen-bonded organic frameworks is to realize the adsorption of guest molecules. This character accelerates the emergence of various applications of different HOFs structures, including gas removal/storage/separation, molecule recognition, proton conduction, and biomedical applications, etc.

History 
The reports of extended 2D hydrogen-bonding-based porous frameworks can be tracked back to the 1960s. In 1969, Duchamp and Marsh reported a 2D interpenetrated nonporous crystal structure with a honeycomb network constructed by benzene-1,3,5-tri-carboxylic acid (trimesic acid or TMA). Then Ermer reported an adamantane-1,3,5,7-tetracarboxylic acid (ADTA) based hydrogen-bonded network with interpenetrated diamond topology. Meanwhile diverse works of guest-induced hydrogen bonded frameworks were reported successively, which gradually developed the concept of hydrogen bonded organic frameworks. Another milestone in the evolution of hydrogen bonded organic frameworks evolution was set by Chen. In 2011, Chen reported a porous organic framework with hydrogen bonding as binding force and for the first time demonstrated its porosity by gas adsorption. Since then, numerous HOF structures have been designed and constructed, meanwhile various applications related to porous frameworks have been attempted and applied to HOFs, whose the effectiveness has been proved.

Hydrogen bonding pairs in HOFs 
Hydrogen bonds formed among various monomers guarantee the construction of hydrogen-bonded organic frameworks with different assembly architectures. The constitution of the hydrogen pairs is based on the structural and functional design of the HOFs, therefore different hydrogen bonding pairs should be selected following systematic requirements. The hydrogen bonding pairs generally include 2,4-diaminotriazine, carboxylic acid, amide, imide, imidazole, imidazolone and resorcinol, etc (Fig. 2). Assorting with appropriate backbones, in every crystallization condition, the hydrogen-bonding pairs will exhibit specific assembly states, which means the morphologies with favored energy for this crystallization condition could be assembled by the monomers. In order to realize 2D or 3D HOFs, monomers with more than one hydrogen bonding pairs are generally under considered: the rigidity and directionality are also in favor of HOF construction.

Backbones of HOF monomer 
Rigidity and directionality of the constructional units offer HOFs various pore structures, topologies and further applications. Therefore, a proper choice of monomer backbones plays an important role in the construction of HOFs. These backbones not only can combine with different hydrogen bonding pairs mentioned above to realize stable HOF structural design and expand pore size, but also give opportunities to offer more topologies of HOFs. Also, by using backbones with similar geometry and same connection pattern to generate the monomers and HOFs, the isoreticular expansion of the frameworks becomes a reliable method to expand the pore size effectively (Fig. 3). As mentioned, for the sake of constructing porous and stable HOFs, multiple aspects should be considered simultaneously, such as the rigidity of the backbones, the orientation and binding strength of the hydrogen pairs, and other intermolecular interactions for orderly stacking. Therefore, the design of HOF monomers should focus on their H-bonds orientations and structural rigidity, and consequent framework stability and porosity.

Synthetic methods 
In principle, HOFs could be crystallized from solvents. However, the factors of solvent types, precursor concentration, crystallization time and temperature, etc., can have significant influence on HOFs cystallization process. Generally the crystal products can be corresponding to kinetics through high concentration and short crystallization time, while slowing down crystallization rate might yield thermodynamic crystals. One common method to produce HOF crystal is to slowly evaporate the solvent of the solution, which benefits the stacking of the monomers. Another widely used method is to diffuse low boiling point poor solvents into monomer solution with higher boiling point good solvents, in order to induce the assembly of the monomers.[24] Depending on different crystallization systems, other methods have also been applied to HOF construction.

Characterization methods 
There are various methods to characterize HOF materials and their monomers. Nuclear magnetic resonance (NMR) spectroscopy and high-resolution mass spectrometry (HR-MS) are generally used for characterizing the synthesis of monomers. Single crystal X-ray diffraction (SCXRD) is the powerful tool for determining the structure of the HOF crystal packing. Powder X-ray diffraction (PXRD) is also a supported technique to demonstrate the pure phase formation of HOFs. The gas adsorption and desorption study through Brunauer-Emmett-Teller (BET) method could reasonably demonstrate some key parameters of HOFs, like pore size, specific gas adsorption amount and surface area from the adsorption isotherms. Depending on application directions and study fields, diverse techniques have been applied to the characterization of HOFs.

Applications 
The porous structures and unique properties guarantee HOFs good application performance in practical fields. The applications include but are not limited to gas adsorption, hydrocarbon separation, proton conductivity, and molecular recognition, etc (Fig. 4).

Gas adsorption 
As a kind of networks with tailorable pore size, HOFs could serve as storage containers for gas molecules with certain sizes and interactions. The relatively constrained pore size in HOFs could help to store, capture, or separate different small gas molecules, including H2, N2, CO2, CH4, C2H2, C2H4, C2H6 and so on. Mastalerz and Oppel reported a special 3D HOFs with triptycene trisbenzimidazolone (TTBI) as constitutional monomers. Because of the molecular rigidity and stereo construction, 1D channels were formed through the frameworks and the surface area was largely enhanced, to the extent of 2796 m2/g as shown by BET. The HOF also presented good adsorption ability of H2 and CO2, as 243 and 80.7 cm3/g at 1 bar at 77 and 273 K, separately.

CO2 adsorption 
As a typical greenhouse gas that could cause serious problems in many aspects, the capture of carbon dioxide is always under big concern. Meanwhile, carbon dioxide has also been widely used as a gas resource or emitted as waste gas in manufacturing and industry, therefore the storage and separation of CO2 have always been emphasized as an important application. Chen and co-workers reported a structural transformation HOF with high CO2 adsorption capacity in 2015. The N–H···N hydrogen bond is formed between the units to realize the assembly of the HOF architecture with binodal topology. The CO2 uptake capacity of the HOF could reach 117.1 cm3/g at 273 K.

Hydrocarbon separation 
The hydrogen-bonded organic framework used for C2H2/C2H4 separation was reported by Chen and coworkers. In the structure of this HOF, each 4,4',4'',4'''-tetra(4,6-diamino-s-triazin-2-yl)tetraphenylmethane unit connected with eight other units by N–H···N hydrogen bonds. Due to certain structural flexibility, the framework was able to uptake C2H2 up to 63.2 cm3/g while the adsorption amount of C2H4 was 8.3 cm3/g at 273 K, showing effective C2H2/C2H4 separation.

Molecules recognition 
The non-covalent interactions existing in the hydrogen-bonded organic frameworks, e.g., hydrogen bonding, π-π interaction and Van der Waals force, are considered as important intermolecular interactions for molecules recognition. Meanwhile, the multiple binding sites and adaptable structures also make HOFs good molecules recognition platform. By exploiting these features, so far different kinds of recognition have been realized, including gas molecules recognition, fullerene recognition, aniline recognition, pyridine recognition, etc.

Optical materials 
Some luminescence molecules with large π conjugation structures are also used for HOFs construction. Therefore, various luminescent HOFs are designed and assembled in order to realize the non-covalent controlled luminescence adjustment which could introduce more functions to the HOF materials. For example, by using tetraphenylethylene (TPE) as backbones, a series of HOFs combined with solvents presenting different color emission have been reported.

Proton conduction 
The hydrogen-bonded organic frameworks constructed with proton carriers have been widely used for proton conduction. The hydrogen bonds can also serve as proton sources in the frameworks to transfer protons. As an example, porphyrin-based structures and guanidinium sulfonate salt monomers have been studied and included in HOF design and construction for proton conduction since the certain conductivity they have.

Biological applications 
As kinds of metal-free porous materials, hydrogen-bonded organic frameworks are also ideal platform for drug delivery and disease treatment. Meanwhile, with proper monomer selection and reasonable arrangement, Cao reported a robust HOF which could effectively encapsulate a cancer drug Doxorubicin and yield singlet oxygen by embedded photoactive pyrene moiety in order to realize dual functions of drug release and photodynamic therapy for cancer remedy.

References 

Wikipedia Student Program
Chemistry articles needing expert attention
Supramolecular chemistry


Materials science
Crystal engineering